China National Space Administration (CNSA) is the government agency of the People's Republic of China that is responsible for civil space administration and international space cooperation, including organizing or leading foreign exchanges and cooperation in the aerospace field. An administrative agency under the Ministry of Industry and Information Technology, its headquarters are located in Haidian, Beijing.

Founded in 1993, CNSA has pioneered a number of achievements in space for China despite its relatively short history, including becoming the first space agency to land on the far side of the Moon with Chang'e 4, bringing material back from the Moon with Chang'e 5, and being the second agency who successfully landed a rover on Mars with Tianwen-1.

As the governing body of civil space activities, China National Space Administration does not execute any space program. The China Aerospace Science and Technology Corporation executes China's state space programs instead. The China Manned Space Program is operated by China Manned Space Agency, instead of the CNSA.

History 
CNSA is an agency created in 1993 when the Ministry of Aerospace Industry was split into CNSA and the China Aerospace Science and Technology Corporation (CASC). The former was to be responsible for policy, while the latter was to be responsible for execution. This arrangement proved somewhat unsatisfactory, as these two agencies were, in effect, one large agency, sharing both personnel and management.

As part of a massive restructuring in 1998, CASC was split into a number of smaller state-owned companies. The intention appeared to have been to create a system similar to that characteristic of Western defense procurement in which entities which are government agencies, setting operational policy, would then contract out their operational requirements to entities which were government-owned, but not government-managed.

Since the passage of the Wolf Amendment in 2011, NASA has been forced by Congress to implement a long-standing exclusion policy with CNSA ever since, though this has been periodically overcome.

Function 
CNSA was established as a government institution to develop and fulfill China's due international obligations, with the approval by the 8th National People's Congress of China (NPC). The 9th NPC assigned CNSA as an internal structure of the Commission of Science, Technology and Industry for National Defense (COSTIND).
CNSA assumes the following main responsibilities: signing governmental agreements in the space area on behalf of organizations, inter-governmental scientific and technical exchanges; and also being in charge of the enforcement of national space policies and managing the national space science, technology and industry.

China has signed governmental space cooperation agreements with Argentina, Brazil, Chile, France, Germany, India, Italy, Pakistan, Russia, Ukraine, the United Kingdom, the United States, and some other countries. Significant achievements have been scored in the bilateral and multilateral and technology exchanges and cooperation.

Administrators of CNSA are appointed by the State Council.

Administrators 
The most recent administrator is Zhang Kejian. Wu Yanhua is vice-administrator and Tian Yulong is secretary general.
 April 1993: Liu Jiyuan
 April 1998: Luan Enjie
 2004: Sun Laiyan
 July 2010: Chen Qiufa
 March 2013: Ma Xingrui
 December 2013: Xu Dazhe
 May 2017: Tang Dengjie
 May 2018: Zhang Kejian

Departments 
There are four departments under the CNSA:
 Department of General Planning
 Department of System Engineering
 Department of Science, Technology and Quality Control
 Department of Foreign Affairs

CNSA's logo is a similar design to that of China Aerospace Science and Technology Corporation. The arrow in the middle is similar to the Chinese character 人 which means 'human' or 'people', to state that humans are the center of all space exploration. The three concentric ellipses stand for three types of escape velocity (minimum speed needed to reach sustainable orbits, to escape the earth system, and to escape the solar system) which are milestones of space exploration. The second ring is drawn with a bold line, to state that China has passed the first stage of exploration (Earth system) and is undergoing the second stage exploration (within the solar system). The 人 character stands above the three rings to emphasize humanity's capability to escape and explore. Olive branches were added to state that China's space exploration is peaceful in nature.

Launch facilities 
Jiuquan Satellite Launch Center
Taiyuan Satellite Launch Center
Xichang Satellite Launch Center
Wenchang Spacecraft Launch Site

See also 

 Chinese Future Giant Telescope
 Chinese Lunar Exploration Program
 Planetary Exploration of China
 Interstellar Express
 List of government space agencies

Notes

References

External links 

 Official website

 
1993 establishments in China
Government agencies established in 1993
Organizations based in Beijing
Space agencies
Space program of the People's Republic of China
Government agencies of China
State Council of the People's Republic of China
Haidian District